Tattnall County is a county located in the southeast portion of the U.S. state of Georgia. As of the 2020 census, the population was 22,842. The county seat is Reidsville. Tattnall County was created on December 5, 1801, from part of Montgomery County, Georgia by the Georgia General Assembly. The county was named after Josiah Tattnall (1762–1803), a planter, soldier and politician. It is located within the Magnolia Midlands, a part of the Historic South region.

Geography

Most of the western portion of Tattnall County, defined by a line running from Cobbtown south to Collins, then east to a point halfway to Bellville, and then south and southwest to the middle of the county's southern border, is located in the Ohoopee River sub-basin of the Altamaha River basin. The northeastern portion of the county, from Cobbtown to east of Reidsville, is located in the Canoochee River sub-basin of the Ogeechee River basin. The southeastern and southwestern parts of Tattnall County are located in the Altamaha River sub-basin of the larger river basin by the same name.

Major highways

   U.S. Route 25/U.S. Route 301
  U.S. Route 280
  State Route 23
  State Route 30
  State Route 56
  State Route 57
  State Route 73
  State Route 121
  State Route 129
  State Route 144
  State Route 147
  State Route 152
  State Route 169
  State Route 178
  State Route 292

Adjacent counties

 Candler County - north
 Evans County - northeast
 Liberty County - east
 Long County - southeast
 Wayne County - south
 Appling County - southwest
 Toombs County - west
 Emanuel County - northwest

Demographics

2000 census
As of the census of 2000, there were 22,305 people, 7,057 households, and 4,876 families living in the county.  The population density was 46 people per square mile (18/km2).  There were 8,578 housing units at an average density of 18 per square mile (7/km2).  The racial makeup of the county was 60.51% White, 31.43% Black or African American, 0.14% Native American, 0.29% Asian, 0.08% Pacific Islander, 6.64% from other races, and 0.92% from two or more races.  8.44% of the population were Hispanic or Latino of any race.

There were 7,057 households, out of which 33.00% had children under the age of 18 living with them, 51.10% were married couples living together, 13.40% had a female householder with no husband present, and 30.90% were non-families. 26.70% of all households were made up of individuals, and 11.90% had someone living alone who was 65 years of age or older.  The average household size was 2.60 and the average family size was 3.12.

In the county, the population was spread out, with 22.90% under the age of 18, 11.20% from 18 to 24, 34.60% from 25 to 44, 20.00% from 45 to 64, and 11.20% who were 65 years of age or older.  The median age was 34 years. For every 100 females there were 136.10 males.  For every 100 females age 18 and over, there were 146.30 males.

The median income for a household in the county was $28,664, and the median income for a family was $35,951. Males had a median income of $28,994 versus $19,984 for females. The per capita income for the county was $13,439.  About 18.60% of families and 23.90% of the population were below the poverty line, including 32.90% of those under age 18 and 20.20% of those age 65 or over.

2010 census
As of the 2010 United States Census, there were 25,520 people, 8,210 households, and 5,568 families living in the county. The racial makeup of the county was 62.7% white, 29.3% black or African American, 0.4% Asian, 0.3% American Indian, 0.1% Pacific islander, 6.0% from other races, and 1.3% from two or more races. Those of Hispanic or Latino origin made up 9.8% of the population. In terms of ancestry, 12.9% were Irish, 6.6% were German, and 5.2% were American.

Of the 8,210 households, 34.2% had children under the age of 18 living with them, 48.4% were married couples living together, 14.1% had a female householder with no husband present, 32.2% were non-families, and 27.7% of all households were made up of individuals. The average household size was 2.52 and the average family size was 3.07. The median age was 36.6 years.

The median income for a household in the county was $38,522 and the median income for a family was $45,601. Males had a median income of $35,240 versus $27,584 for females. The per capita income for the county was $16,742. About 14.7% of families and 21.4% of the population were below the poverty line, including 27.1% of those under age 18 and 11.9% of those age 65 or over.

2020 census

As of the 2020 United States census, there were 22,842 people, 8,241 households, and 5,875 families residing in the county.

Government and infrastructure

The Georgia Department of Corrections operates the Rogers State Prison, and formerly the Georgia State Prison in unincorporated Tattnall County,, near Reidsville.  As of 2020, according to the Georgia State Prison Fact Sheet, the facility occupies 9,800 acres of land inside Tattnall County and provides 162 staff housing units on the reservation.  The prison cemetery has 971 burials which are inmates who died while serving time from 1937 to present.

Another large government parcel of land is the 10,000 acre Big Hammock Wildlife Management Preserve in the southwest section of the county. The entrance is 12 miles south of Glennville on Hwy 144 at the Ohoopee River Bridge.   This is controlled by the GA Department of Natural Resources under the Wildlife Resources Division.  It has a shooting range and 2 boat ramps along the river which are north of the merger with the Altamaha River which forms the southern border of the county.  Permits are issued for seasonal hunting of deer, turkey, and small game.  Updates are posted at www.GoHuntGeorgia.com

Another large government land parcel is on the eastern side of Tattnall County along the border with Evans, Liberty, and Long Counties.  This 6000+ acres forms the western side of the Fort Stewart Army Reservation which is based in Hinesville, GA.  Originally this was farmland purchased by the Army during and after World War II.  It has since been turned into forest land with no development. The current Ft. Stewart Land Use Development plan excludes any of this property in their 25-year future planning approved by the Department of Defense.  This land mass can be viewed on Google Maps with additional info from the website for the Ft. Stewart Joint Land Use Study. (www.mrrpc.com/Misc_pdfs/Fort_Stewart_JLUS_Final_Report.pdf)

Politics

Communities

Cities
 Cobbtown
 Collins
 Glennville (largest city)
 Manassas
 Reidsville (county seat)

Census-designated place
 Mendes

Education
Tattnall County School District serves as the designated K-12 school district, except parts in Fort Stewart. Fort Stewart has the Department of Defense Education Activity (DoDEA) as its local school district, for the elementary level. Students at the secondary level on Fort Stewart attend public schools operated by county school districts.

See also

 National Register of Historic Places listings in Tattnall County, Georgia
List of counties in Georgia

References

 
Georgia (U.S. state) counties
1801 establishments in Georgia (U.S. state)
Populated places established in 1801